This is a list of squads selected for the 2017 ICC Champions Trophy.

Group A

Australia
Coach:  Darren Lehmann

Bangladesh
Coach:  Chandika Hathurusingha

England
Coach:  Trevor Bayliss

Chris Woakes was ruled out of the rest of the tournament after suffering a side-strain during England's opening match against Bangladesh. Steven Finn was added to the squad as his replacement.

New Zealand
Coach:   Mike Hesson

Group B

India
Coach:  Anil Kumble

Ahead of the tournament Dinesh Karthik replaced Manish Pandey, who was ruled out with a side strain.

Pakistan
Coach:  Mickey Arthur

Umar Akmal was included in the provisional squad named by the PCB, but failed a fitness test and was called back from England. Haris Sohail was named as his replacement.

Wahab Riaz was ruled out of the tournament with an ankle injury after his team's opening match. He was replaced in the squad by Rumman Raees.

Sri Lanka
Coach:  Graham Ford

Chamara Kapugedera injured his knee during the tournament and was replaced by Danushka Gunathilaka.
Kusal Perera was ruled out of the tournament with a hamstring injury and was replaced by Dhananjaya de Silva.

South Africa
Coach:   Russell Domingo

References

External links
 ICC Champions Trophy 2017 Squads on ESPN Cricinfo

ICC Champions Trophy squads
2017 ICC Champions Trophy